Action! (also known as The Action Album) is the second studio album released by Oh My God.

Track listing
All tracks by Billy O'Neill

 "Action" – 2:02
 "The Beauty of Servitude" – 2:58
 "The Weather" – 2:54
 "Reading Stones" – 3:05
 "Aura" – 3:09
 "14" – 3:00
 "Go, Team" – 3:42
 "Burn, Burn, Burn" – 2:51
 "That Fight" – 2:24
 "The Uptown Lumber" – 3:35
 "X10" – 6:00
 "Letter 12/98" – 10:11
 "Where Are We?" – 2:38

Personnel 
Billy O'Neill – vocals, bass
Ig – organ, vocals
Zach Nold – drums

2002 albums
Oh My God (band) albums